Hamish Kyle Bennett (born 22 February 1987) is a New Zealand former international cricketer who played for the New Zealand national cricket team. He played for Wellington in New Zealand domestic competitions. Earlier in his career he represented New Zealand in the 2006 ICC Under-19 Cricket World Cup in Sri Lanka.

Domestic career
Bennett initially played domestic cricket for Canterbury. In June 2018 however, he was awarded a contract with Wellington for the 2018–19 season.

He was the leading wicket-taker in the 2018–19 Ford Trophy tournament, with 28 dismissals in twelve matches. He was also the leading wicket-taker in the 2019–20 Super Smash tournament, with seventeen dismissals in eleven matches.

In June 2020, he was offered a contract by Wellington ahead of the 2020–21 domestic cricket season.

He officially retired from all formats of cricket in April 2022

International career
He made his first One Day International (ODI) appearance against Bangladesh in October 2010, where he was New Zealand's best performing bowler, taking three wickets. The following month he made his only Test match appearance in a drawn match against India. After bowling fifteen wicketless overs in the first innings, he was unable to bowl in the second innings because of an injury.

Bennett was included in to the New Zealand squad for 2011 ICC Cricket World Cup held on the Indian subcontinent. He took four wickets against Kenya in Chennai where he adjudged man of the match award. He returned to the ODI team in January 2014 to play the third one-day match between New Zealand and India after being sidelined for two years due to a serious back injury. In January 2020, Bennett was named in New Zealand's Twenty20 International (T20I) squad for their series against India, after last representing New Zealand in May 2017. He made his T20I debut on 24 January 2020.

Coaching
Bennett is the current bowling coach of the Wellington team.

References

1987 births
Living people
Canterbury cricketers
Wellington cricketers
New Zealand cricketers
New Zealand Test cricketers
New Zealand One Day International cricketers
New Zealand Twenty20 International cricketers
Cricketers at the 2011 Cricket World Cup
Cricketers from Timaru
South Island cricketers